Sphinx luscitiosa, or Clemens' hawkmoth, is a moth of the family Sphingidae. The species was first described by James Brackenridge Clemens in 1859. It is found in North America from Nova Scotia south to New Jersey, west through Michigan, Wisconsin and the northern plains to Alberta, Saskatchewan and Montana and south to Utah. It has been taken as far north as Yukon.

The wingspan is 56–80 mm. There is one generation per year with adults on wing from June to July.

The larvae feed on Salix, Populus, Malus, Fraxinus, Morella and Betula species.

References

External links 

"Sphinx luscitiosa Clemens 1859". Moths of North Dakota. Retrieved November 14, 2020.

Sphinx (genus)
Moths described in 1859
Moths of North America